Qivicon is an alliance of companies from different industries that was founded in 2011 by Deutsche Telekom. The companies are collaborating on a cross-vendor, wireless-based home automation solution that has been available in the German market since the fall of 2013. It includes products in the areas of energy, security, and comfort. It connects and combines controllable devices made by different manufacturers such as motion detectors, smoke detectors, water detectors, wireless adapters for power outlets, door and window contact, temperature and humidity sensors, wireless switches, carbon monoxide sensors, thermostats, cameras, household appliances (e. g. washing machines, dryers, coffee machines), weather stations, sound systems, and lighting controls.

Qivicon has stated that it would like to take the "Smart Home" further forward around the world. The alliance uses Smart Home optimized wireless protocols to make solutions easy to install in any home without needing to lay cables. The technical platform is international and open for companies of all sizes and in all industries.

Members 
It currently consists of over 43 companies in different industries such as energy, electrical and household appliances, security and telecommunications. Qivicon partners include Deutsche Telekom, E wie Einfach, eQ-3, Miele, Samsung and Philips. In March 2018, Deutsche Telekom announced that it had integrated the Home Connect platform, which works with Bosch and Siemens connected devices, into Qivicon to enable greater functunality between the two. For example, as well as being able to control connected Bosch and Siemens appliances directly via the Home Connect app. DT also announced a number of new compatible devices broaden the Qivicon portfolio, such as the Nest Protect smoke and CO alarm.

EnBW
 eQ-3
Miele
Samsung
Deutsche Telekom
Assa Abloy
 bitronvideo
 Centralite
Cosmote
digitalSTROM
D-Link
 DOM Technologies
 Entega
 E WIE EINFACH
 eww Gruppe
Gigaset
 Google
Huawei
 Hitch
Home Connect
Junkers
kpn
Logitech
 Nest
Netatmo
Osram
 PaX
Philips
 Plugwise
RheinEnergie
 Sengled
Smappee
Sonos
 Stadtwerke Bonn
 VW

History 
The Qivicon platform has been around in the German market since the fall of 2013.

The platform's technical control unit, its home base, is connected to the Internet via a broadband connection in the house or apartment. In August 2016, Qivicon launched a new generation of the home base focusing on international markets. The range of different models will keep up with the diverse range of wireless protocols found throughout the international market. The models all have an identical outward appearance. But they differ in terms of their pre-installed protocols. For example, the model designed for the German market, and several other markets, already includes the protocols HomeMatic, ZigBee Pro and the inclusion of HomeMatic IP and DECT ULE has also been completed. Another model includes the ZigBee Pro and Z-Wave radio modules. All versions of the new home base can be connected to home DSL routers either by cable, wirelessly, via Wi-Fi or via Deutsche Telekom's Speedport Smart router.

The system can be expanded to include other wireless standards by means of USB sticks for which there are four corresponding slots in the home base of the first generation and two slots in the second generation. Qivicon partners’ devices can be controlled and monitored via various partner apps for the smartphone, the tablet or the PC. Since November 2017 Qivicon is compatible with Alexa from Amazon. Users can control lights, blinds or alarm systems with their voice via Amazon Echo or Google Home.

In March 2017, Deutsche Telekom launched a White Label Smart Home portfolio that includes platform, gateways, applications, compatible devices and services. The portfolio is designed to help telecommunications service providers, utility providers, hardware manufacturers and other enterprises create and offer smart home services.

Deutsche Telekom extended its international footprint within the smart home sector by partnering with Cosmote, the largest mobile operator in Greece and part of the OTE group, as well as Hitch in Norway, adding Greece and Norway to Qivicon's current footprint of Germany, Slovakia, the Netherlands, Austria, and Italy.

AV-Test, an IT security test institution, rates Qivicon as “secure”. It found that the Smart Home platform used encryption for communication and provided protection from unauthorized access.

Awards 
Qivicon won repeat awards from the international management consulting company Frost & Sullivan’s. In 2016, Frost & Sullivan has awarded Qivicon with the European Connected Home New Product Innovation Award. In 2014, the smart home platform has been awarded with the European Visionary Innovation Leadership Award in recognition of what the management consulting company saw as the most innovative Smart Home solution of the year.

References

Bibliography 
Ohland, Günther. Smart-Living. Books on Demand, Norderstedt 2013. .

External links 
 Qivicon home page

Home automation
Building engineering organizations
Technology consortia
Environmental technology
Building automation